Eran Ortal (born 22 October 1971) is an Israeli brigadier-general and military theorist, and is current commander of The Dado Center for Interdisciplinary Military Studies. Ortal is also the founder and editor of the Israel Defense Force Dado Center journal named "Bein Ha-ktavim" ("In between the Poles").

Biography
Ortal was born in Bat Yam, Israel. He was drafted into the IDF Nahal Brigade in 1989, and served in southern Lebanon and the west Bank in the Combat Intelligence Collection Corps. In 1993, he completed his active service and studied history and political science, He then did a master's degree in security studies at TAU.

In 1999, Ortal returned to the IDF as an operations researcher in the Planning Branch/J5 of the IDF General Staff. In 2004, he transferred to the Operations Division, where he served in a variety of positions in operational planning. Ortal attended the IDF brigade commanders course in 2012, and the next year began studying in the Israel National Security College while also serving as a research fellow. In 2013, Ortal was promoted to the rank of colonel and became the Dado Center's deputy commander and head of think tank. He was promoted to brigadier-general in 2019 and replaced BG Dr. Meir Finkel as commander of the Dado Center.

Scholarship

Ortal's published work focuses on operational planning and IDF force design at the general staff level. He is regarded as prominent self-critical voice within the IDF, challenging core beliefs and methods at the operational and strategic levels within the organization. He advocates an operational art approach, and founded the Dado Center Journal that features senior officers examining and critiquing IDF strategy, force employment, and force design.

Ortal, along with Gen. Tamir Yadai, argued that since Operation Accountability in 1993, the IDF has pursued a de facto doctrine they call the "deterrence operations paradigm." They wrote that the reasons for the emergence of this paradigm are the rise of stand-off fires capabilities, a perceived reduction in the relevance of the battlefield victory idea, and a parallel rise in the belief of the coercion and punishment approach against state actors. Ortal and Yadai claim that this paradigm has been shown to be a failure that does not achieve its aims. They propose a conceptual and practical framework to restore the battlefield victory approach in the IDF.

In recent years, the two officers have adapted their approach to deal with the challenge of "missile-based terror armies", like Hezbollah and Hamas. In a series of articles, Ortal stressed the strategic significance of the rocket threat on Israel, and the imperative of developing a new offensive approach to defeat the new threat. Gen. Aharon Haliva, head of the IDF Operations Directorate during Operation Guardian of the Walls in May 2021, published an article in DCJ calling for the "Extinguish of the fire" approach that Ortal advocated, as a means of stopping the adversary's fires offensive across the border and taking away his ability to pursue a campaign against Israel. Ortal has also analyzed core issues the IDF has dealt with in recent years, including ground maneuver, subterranean threats, the rocket threat, and the IDF's learning and transformation system. In a Res Militaris article called "Israel’s Strategic Border Challenge – The Growth of the Tunnel Threat under the Cover of Rockets," Ortal highlighted the connection between rockets in Gaza and the freedom to dig Hamas has enjoyed since 2014.

His critique of the IDF's General Staff force design system and strategic learning system led to practical changes in the IDF, many of which are reflected in Chief of Staff Aviv Kochavi’s Momentum Multi-Year Plan. Some of these reforms include the creation of the Shiloach Division, and the division of the Planning Directorate into two branches, one that deals with force design and the other that deals with strategy and Iran. Ortal's work is also reflected in IDF's Operational Concept for Victory.

Ortal played a central role in strategic thought processes in the Military Intelligence Directorate (Ma’aseh Aman) and in the Ground Forces (Land Ahead). Both processes describe a critical evaluation of the performance of these arrays in light of change, and offer a solution based on the potential in the changing world, especially in technological development. In both cases, Ortal looks at both processes several years later and asks why the desired change did not occur to the extent desired.

Ortal has also been involved in digitization and turning the world of networks into a combat paradigm that takes advantage of the fourth industrial revolution. He dealt with these subjects in his work on Ma’aseh Aman and Land Ahead.

Published works
 Eran Ortal, the Battle The before War: The Inside Story of the IDF's Tansformation, Israel Ministry of Defense Publishing House and The Dado Center for Interdisciplinary Military Studies, 2022

References

External links
 Brigadier General Eran Ortal Biography at The Dado Center English website.
 Lazar Berman, ‘Time is not on our side’: Retiring IDF general calls for urgent army overhaul, The Times of Israel, 15 february 2023.
 Israeli Military Thinking: Insights and Analysis, Centre on Radicalisation & Terrorism (CRT), March 8, 2023.

Military strategy
Tel Aviv University alumni
Military theory
1971 births
Living people
People from Bat Yam
Israeli officers
Israeli generals
Israeli military personnel